The 1974 season of the Torneo Descentralizado, the top category of Peruvian football, was played by 22 teams. The top six qualified to the final group stage. The relegation system was as follows: The last-placed team was relegated, the worst Lima-based, Arequipa-based and Lima Province-based teams were relegated. The national champions were Universitario.

Teams

Results

First stage

Triangular de Revalidación

Final group

External links 
 Peru 1974 season at RSSSF
 Peruvian Football League News 

Peruvian Primera División seasons
Peru
Primera Division Peruana